Andreas Gruber (born 29 June 1996) is an Austrian professional footballer who currently plays as a winger for Austria Wien.

Career
Gruber made his league debut in a 1–1 home draw against Austria Wien by coming on as a substitute for Daniel Beichler after 81 minutes.

International career
Gruber is a youth international for Austria.

Career statistics

Club

References

External links
Eurosport profile

1996 births
Living people
Austrian footballers
Austria youth international footballers
German footballers
German people of Austrian descent
SK Sturm Graz players
LASK players
FK Austria Wien players
Austrian Football Bundesliga players
People from Lienz
Association football midfielders
Footballers from Tyrol (state)